Paul Rizzuto (born 14 September 1936) is an Australian fencer. He competed in the team sabre event at the 1964 Summer Olympics.

References

1936 births
Living people
Australian male fencers
Olympic fencers of Australia
Fencers at the 1964 Summer Olympics